Drvenik may mean:

 Drvenik, Split-Dalmatia County, village near Makarska, Croatia
 Drvenik, Dubrovnik-Neretva County, village in Konavle, Croatia
 Drvenik Veli, island in central Dalmatia, Croatia
 Drvenik Veliki, settlement on Drvenik Veli
 Drvenik Mali, island in central Dalmatia, Croatia